The Burton Awards program is held in association with the Library of Congress, presented by lead sponsor Law360, and co-sponsored by the American Bar Association. The awards are generally selected by professors from Harvard Law School, Yale Law School, Stanford Law School, and Columbia Law School, among others. Former Chief Judge Richard Posner of the Seventh Circuit Court of Appeals and Justice Carol Corrigan of the Supreme Court of California are honorary members on the board of directors. In addition, U.S. Senators John Cornyn, Bob Casey Jr., Mike Crapo, Michael Bennet, Chris Van Hollen, Cory Gardner, and Jim Risch are also honorary members. 
 
Each year, an elite number of Legal Writing Award winners are chosen from partners at the largest law firms in the nation, as well as Law School Award winners. Other Burton Awards are presented annually which include the "Book of the Year Award," and "Outstanding Contributions to Legal Writing Education Award." Even awards to lawyers in the military are given at the event.

The award ceremonies are annually held at the Library of Congress in Washington D.C. Prominent officials who have been guest speakers at the event have included John G. Roberts, Jr., Chief Justice of the United States, Supreme Court Justice Stephen Breyer, Justice Antonin Scalia, Justice Ruth Bader Ginsburg, Justice Sonia Sotomayor and Justice John Paul Stevens (retired). In the past, other well-known dignitaries have participated in the program including Tom Brokaw, Bob Schieffer, Tim Russert, Chris Matthews, George Will and master of ceremonies, Bill Press. The entertainers have included Idina Menzel, Shin Lim, Megan Hilty, Jay Leno, Kristen Chenoweth, Bernadette Peters, and Vanessa Williams.

Awards 

 Distinguished Writing Awards - Category of Law Firms  Presented to the best law firm authors of articles dealing with legal issues published in the previous year.
 Distinguished Writing Awards - Category of Law Schools  Presented to the best law school authors of articles dealing with legal issues published in the previous year.
 Distinguished Public Service in the Military -  Presented to the finest lawyers in the military.
 Outstanding Contributions to Legal Writing Education Award -  Presented for outstanding contributions to the education of new lawyers in the field of legal analysis, research and writing, whether through teaching, program design, program support, innovative thinking or writing.
 The Legends in Law Awards - * Category of General Counsel  This  selection is made on the following criteria: reputation in both the legal profession and as a proven authority in a specialized area of law; background and experience; complexity and scope of matters handled; global or national importance of issues confronted and proven and exemplary leadership in law.
Technology Advancement in Law Award - Presented to a leader in technology, whose innovations profoundly benefit the practice of law.
Law Firm Leadership Award - Presented to one of the finest professionals who have helped their firm to succeed in reputation and business, protected their firms against formidable obstacles, and who is highly ethical and universally respected.
 Book of the Year Award - Presented to the authors of the most outstanding book in the profession of law.
 The Outstanding Journalist in Law - Presented for a lifetime of achievement and accomplishment reporting on legal issues, cases or the profession.

Honorary Board of Directors 

The honorary and distinguished Board of Directors of the Burton Awards program includes:  Les Parrette, Senior Vice President, General Counsel and Compliance Officer, Novelis Inc. and Deputy Chairman, The Burton Awards; Former Chief Judge Richard A. Posner, U.S. Court of Appeals for the Seventh Circuit; U.S. Senator John Cornyn; U.S. Senator Robert P. Casey, Jr.; U.S. Senator Mike Crapo; U.S. Senator Michael F. Bennet; U.S. Senator Chris Van Hollen; U.S. Senator Cory Gardner; U.S. Senator James E. Risch; Justice Carol A. Corrigan, California Court of Appeals; Yabo Lin, Partner, Sidley Austin LLP; Jane Sullivan Roberts, Managing Partner, Mlegal Group, Inc.; H. Rodgin Cohen, Senior Chairman, Sullivan & Cromwell LLP; Lisa A. Rickard, President, U.S. Chamber Institute for Legal Reform, Executive Vice President, U.S. Chamber of Commerce; Tom Sager, Partner, Ballard Spahr LLP; Betty Whelchel, Head of Public Policy & Regulatory Affairs, BNP Paribas SA (retired); Linda A. Klein, Senior Managing Shareholder, Baker, Donelson, Bearman, Caldwell & Berkowitz, PC; and Stephen R. Mysliwiec, Partner, DLA Piper LLP (US).

External links 
 Official site

References 

 
 

Legal awards
Awards established in 1999
1999 establishments in the United States